Dezhung Rinpoche Kunga Tenpai Nyima, born Kunchok Lhundrup (February 26, 1906–1987), was a Tibetan lama of the Sakya school. Sakya is one of four major schools of Tibetan Buddhism, the others being the Nyingma, Kagyu, and Gelug. In 1960 he came to Seattle, Washington in the United States of America, one of the first Tibetan lamas to settle and teach in the United States.

Rinpoche was the teacher of a number of renowned Tibetologists, including Turrell V. Wylie and E. Gene Smith, Tibetan Art expert Jeff Watt and the root teacher of leading translator Christopher Wilkinson.

Rinpoche died in 1987. His claimed reincarnation, Dezhung Rinpoche IV, was born in Seattle in 1991, and trained at Tharlam Monastery in Nepal.

References

External links
Biography of Dezhung Rinpoche
Peer-reviewed biography of Dezhung Rinpoche on The Treasury of Lives

1987 deaths
1906 births
Sakya lamas
Rinpoches
Tibetan Buddhists from Tibet